The GEPA is Europe's largest alternative trading organization. The abbreviation GEPA³ stands for "Gesellschaft zur Förderung der Partnerschaft mit der Dritten Welt mbH“, literally meaning "Society for the Promotion of Partnership with the Third World".

Mission 
The main goal of GEPA³ is to improve the living and working conditions of people in the South, following the spirit of the UN Agenda 21 for economic, social and ecological sustainability.

Partners of GEPA 
Evangelischer Entwicklungsdienst (EED) (Evangelical Development Service),
Bischöfliches Hilfswerk Misereor der Katholischen Kirche (Misereor Episcopal Welfare Organisation of the Catholic Church),
Arbeitsgemeinschaft der Evangelischen Jugend (aej) (Consortium of the Evangelical Youth),
Bund der Deutschen Katholischen Jugend (BDKJ) (Federation of the German Catholic Youth),
Päpstliches Missionswerk der Kinder in Deutschland e.V. (PMK) Papal Missionary work of Children in Germany (since 25 October 2004).

Sale Structure 
15 regional fair trade centres in the Federal Republic of Germany supply approximately 800 shops worldwide and roughly 6,000 action groups with fairly traded groceries and handcrafted products. Numerous supermarkets and food retailers also sell gepa products. Business canteens, student unions, conference houses etc. are provided by gepa on a wholesaler basis. The gepa website also has an online shop which generates sales.

The "Regionalen Fair Handelszentren" or RFZ (Regional Commercial Fairs) are partly owned by gepa with the other part belonging to independent sponsors.

RFZs sponsored by GEPA themselves:
West (Wuppertal)
Central (Alzenau)
South (Leonberg)
Fair Trade Centre (Berlin)

RFZs sponsored independently:
Saarland (Saarbrücken)
North (Hamburg)
Bavaria (Haimhausen/Amperpettenbach)
Saxony (Dresden)
Aachen
Bad Abbach
Bonn
Cadolzburg
Münster
Munich
Northeim

Membership 
GEPA is a FLO International registered Fairtrade licensee and importer. The organization is also a licensee of Naturland Zeichen GmbH and a member of the European Fair Trade Association (EFTA), the World Fair Trade Organization (WFTO) and the Forums Fairer Handel.

Campaigns 
 As a member in the Forum Fairer Handel, taking part in the Fairen Woche ("Fair Week") organisation.
 Together with the Weltladen-Dachverband, leading a campaign for the development of activities ("Professionalisation") of Weltladen until 2006.

Periodical Publications 
 Info Dienst
 Info Service
 Pressedienst (Press Service)

External links 
http://www.gepa.de Homepage of GEPA³ (German)
http://www.gepa.de Homepage of GEPA³ (English)
http://www.eed.de Homepage of the Evangelischen Entwicklungsdienstes (EED)
http://www.misereor.de Homepage of the Hilfswerkes Misereor
http://www.bdkj.de Homepage of the Bund der Deutschen Katholischen Jugend
http://www.evangelische-jugend.de Homepage of the Arbeitsgemeinschaft der Evangelischen Jugend
http://www.fairewoche.de
fairsprochen.org - das FAIRE Forum
Die Krise der Kaffeewirtschaft (Teil II): Wege aus der globalen Preiskrise (The crisis of the coffee economy (Part II): Ways out of the global price crisis).
http://www.interrupcionfairtrade.net

Alternative trading organizations
Fair trade brands
Organizations established in 1975
Wuppertal